NGC 5584 is a barred spiral galaxy in the constellation Virgo. It was discovered July 27, 1881 by American astronomer E. E. Barnard. Distance determination using Cepheid variable measurements gives an estimate of 75 million light years, whereas the tip of the red-giant branch approach yields a distance of 73.4 million light years. It is a member of the Virgo III Groups, a series of galaxies and galaxy clusters strung out to the east of the Virgo Supercluster of galaxies.

The morphological class of NGC 5584 is SAB(rs)cd, which indicates this spiral galaxy has an inner bar (SAB), an incomplete inner ring structure (rs), and loosely wound spiral arms (cd). It is flocculent in appearance with only a small nucleus. Star formation is occurring along the spiral arms. The galactic plane is inclined at an angle of 42.4° to the line of sight from the Earth, and it spans more than 50,000 light-years across. 250 Cepheid variables have been observed in NGC 5584.

Two supernova events have been observed in NGC 5584. SN 1996aq was a Type Ic supernova discovered August 17, 1996 by Masakatsu Aoki in Japan. It reached magnitude 14.7 on August 18. SN 2007af was spotted at magnitude 15.4 on February 24 by K. Itagaki, also of Japan. A light echo of this event was observed about 1,000 days after its discovery.

References

External links 
 
 Spiral Key to Universe's Expansion: ESA/Hubble Picture of the week.

Barred spiral galaxies
Virgo (constellation)
5584
51344
9201